Qul Darreh (also Romanized as Qūl Darreh; also known as Qūlahdarreh) is a village in Kivanat Rural District, Kolyai District, Sonqor County, Kermanshah Province, Iran. At the 2006 census, its population was 149, in 35 families.

References 

Populated places in Sonqor County